Despite its long interaction with water, the Netherlands has little potential for hydropower due to its flat topography. The Netherlands has a large resource of moving water in its major rivers but its limited hydraulic head because of little elevation change means that hydropower is a minor component of the country's renewable energy portfolio. A few small hydro plants exist but in total produce less than one tenth of one percent (<0.1%) of the Netherlands' electricity.

See also
 Electricity sector in the Netherlands
 Energy in the Netherlands
 Wind power in the Netherlands
 Solar power in the Netherlands
 Renewable energy in the Netherlands

References